A Tiempo is the fourth studio album by American Latin pop duo Ha*Ash. It was released under the label Sony BMG on 16 May 2011. Recording sessions for the album was over a period of almost a year between Los Angeles, California and Milan, Italia. A Tiempo is a primarily a synth-pop sound and electric album, consisting mainly of stripped down instruments such as the synthesizers, piano and acoustic guitar.

Four singles were released from A Tiempo worldwide. "Impermeable" was released as the lead single on March 21, 2011. The following singles "Te Dejo en Libertad", "Todo No Fue Suficiente" and "¿De Dónde Sacas Eso?". Ha*Ash promoted the album with a series of live performances and later embarked on A Tiempo Tour (2011).

Background and production 
It is the band's first studio album in three years, after of their previous album, Habitación Doble (2008), and it was recorded over a period of almost a year between Los Angeles, California and Milan, Italia. Ha*Ash worked with producer Áureo Baqueiro and invited Michele Canova. A Tiempo is a primarily a synth-pop sound and electric album, consisting mainly of stripped down instruments such as the synthesizers, piano and acoustic guitar.

Ha*Ash, with the help of Leonel Garcia (Sin Bandera), Natalia Lafourcade and Alejandro Fernández, created one of the best albums of his career and became so successful that they had released a special edition, a deluxe edition, and went for tours through Latin America.

Released and promotion 
The album was released on 16 May 2011 in the United States and Mexico, under the Sony Music Latin label. The deluxe edition of A Tiempo includes the acoustic videos, an audio CD, an exclusive documentary, and was made available on 20 March 2012.

Singles 
Ha*Ash released four song from the album starting with the first single "Impermeable" (Waterproof) was released as the album's lead single on 21 March 2011 and peaked at number 1 in the Mexico Español Airplay and 6 in the Mexico Airplay. On 2012 the song was certified gold in Mexico.

The other songs released were; "Te Dejo en Libertad" (I'll Leave You in Freedom) was chosen as the album's second single, released on 11 July 2011. It peaked at #29 on Billboard Latin Pop chart and #1 on Mexico Español Airplay, Mexico Airplay and Monitor Latino. The single was released to U.S. radio this upcoming 8 August. In 2013, it was announced that "Te Dejo en Libertad" had been certified Platinum and Gold.

"Todo No Fue Suficiente" (All Was Not Enough) was released as the album's third single on 2 January 2012. It peaked at #11 and #2 on Billboard Mexican Chart, and "¿De Dónde Sacas Eso?" (Where Do You Get That?) was released as the album's fourth single on 11 July 2012. It peaked at #4 and #9 on Billboard Mexican Chart. On 2014 the song was certified gold in Mexico.

Commercial performance 
The album peaked at #4 in the Mexican album charts. A Tiempo was certified gold two month after its release in Mexico for shipments of over 30,000 copies, according to the AMPROFON. On 15 May 2012, was certified as Platinum and gold, subsequently as double platinum, for exceeding sales of 120,000 sold copies on 29 November 2017. In April 2019, it was announced by AMPROFON that the album had achieved a double platinum and gold certification, which equals 150,000 copies sold.

Tour 
To promote the album, Ha*Ash embarked on a world concert tour during 2011 and 2013. They started their own "A Tiempo Tour" in 2011, visiting Mexico, United States Spain, Costa Rica, Peru and Ecuador. The tour began in the National Auditorium of Mexico City on 24 September 2011 and ended two year later.

Track listing

Formats
CD;–  includes the 11-track album.
CD and DVD (Mexican edition standard) – Digipak case edition containing two discs: DVD of the concert and one CD containing 11 tracks.
CD and DVD (Edition deluxe) – Digipak case edition containing three discs: DVD of the concert and two CD containing 14 tracks.
Digital download;– contains the 14 tracks from the CD release.
Digital download (Edition deluxe);– contains the 14 tracks from the CD release, 14 videos and a documentary.

Credits and personnel 
Credits adapted from the liner notes of the Mexican deluxe edition of A Tiempo.

Musicians

 Ashley Grace – vocals 
 Hanna Nicole – vocals 
 Áureo Baqueiro: keyboards , vocals 
 Vicky Echeverri: background vocals , keyboards 
 René Garza: guitar 
 Christian Rigano: keyboards 
 Aaron Sterling: drums

Production

 Áureo Baqueiro: arranger , producer 
 Michele Canova: arranger , producer 
 Pablo Manresa arranger 
 Rafa Vergara: arranger

Design

 Charlie García: A&R
 Guillermo Gutiérrez-Leyva: A&R
 Betto Rojas: A&R

Charts

Weekly charts

Year-end charts

Certifications

Release history

References

External links 
 ha-ash.com
 Sister-duo-Ha-Ash-Houston

Ha*Ash albums
Ha*Ash video albums
2011 albums
2011 video albums
Spanish-language albums
Sony Music Latin albums